The Sorlie Memorial Bridge, also known as the Red River Bridge, was constructed in 1929 by the Minneapolis Bridge Company to connect the cities of Grand Forks, North Dakota and East Grand Forks, Minnesota. It was placed on the National Register of Historic Places in 1999.

The Sorlie Memorial Bridge replaced a swing bridge on the same site that was built in 1889. It is a Parker through truss bridge with two truss spans and rides on rails to accommodate the ever-changing banks of the Red River of the North. The Sorlie Memorial Bridge was named for North Dakota's 14th governor, Arthur G. Sorlie. Plaques on either end identify Sorlie as "a true friend of better roads and bridges." At the time, the bridge was the only vehicular crossing in the area, and was important for carrying U.S. Route 2, a transcontinental route.

Further reading
 Mark Hufstetler. , National Register of Historic Places Multiple Property Submission. National Park Service, December 10, 1996

See also

 List of bridges on the National Register of Historic Places in North Dakota
 List of bridges on the National Register of Historic Places in Minnesota
 National Register of Historic Places listings in Grand Forks County, North Dakota
 National Register of Historic Places listings in Polk County, Minnesota

References

External links

 Web Camera showing live view of Sorlie Memorial Bridge

Road bridges on the National Register of Historic Places in North Dakota
Transportation in Grand Forks County, North Dakota
Bridges completed in 1929
Road bridges on the National Register of Historic Places in Minnesota
Monuments and memorials in North Dakota
Monuments and memorials in Minnesota
National Register of Historic Places in Polk County, Minnesota
National Register of Historic Places in Grand Forks, North Dakota
U.S. Route 2
Bridges of the United States Numbered Highway System
Parker truss bridges in the United States
1929 establishments in Minnesota
1929 establishments in North Dakota
Interstate vehicle bridges in the United States